The Orde van den Prince or Order of the Prince is a Flemish-Dutch society for the promotion of the language and culture of the Dutch-speaking Low Countries (Flanders and Netherlands). Each month members meet on fixed locations, except during summer.

History
The organization was founded in November 1955, by the lawyer Guido van Gheluwe from Kortrijk. The name of the society is derived from William the Silent. He was chosen because of his role in the history of the Netherlands and its tolerance (relative to the standards of his time). The logo of the Orde van den Prince is the capital letter P, surrounded by the words Amicitia (friendship) and Tolerantia (tolerance).

The organization shows a steady increase in membership and now consists of 99 departments: 54 in Flanders, 4 in Wallonia, 29 in the Netherlands and 12 in other countries. Membership, currently over 3,000, is by invitation only.

See also
 De Warande, Flemish business club

Sources
 Puype, Jan, De elite van België, Van Halewyck, Leuven, 2004

External links
 

Foundations based in Belgium
Gentlemen's clubs in Belgium
Dutch language advocacy organizations